Video Pieces was a home video released in 1983 on VHS, Betamax, LaserDisc, Video 8 and the Japan-only VHD format. This release contains four promotional videos by the heavy metal band Iron Maiden. This is one of the few Iron Maiden released videos to not feature Eddie the Head on the cover.

Track listing

Personnel
 Bruce Dickinson – vocals
 Dave Murray – guitar
 Adrian Smith – guitar
 Steve Harris – bass
 Clive Burr – drums (on "The Number of the Beast" and "Run to the Hills")
 Nicko McBrain – drums (on "Flight of Icarus" and "The Trooper")

References

Iron Maiden video albums
1983 video albums
Music video compilation albums
1983 compilation albums